Lester Rudolph Witherspoon (June 7, 1926 – March 15, 1980) was an American Negro league outfielder in the 1940s.

A native of Kissimmee, Florida, Witherspoon played for the Indianapolis Clowns in 1948. In five recorded games, he posted five hits in 17 plate appearances. Witherspoon went on to play minor league baseball throughout the 1950s with such clubs as the San Diego Padres, Salem Senators, and Texas City Texans. He died in Miami, Florida in 1980 at age 53.

References

External links
 and Seamheads

1926 births
1980 deaths
Indianapolis Clowns players
Baseball outfielders
Baseball players from Florida
People from Kissimmee, Florida
20th-century African-American sportspeople
Lakeland Pilots players
Minot Mallards players
Porterville Comets players
Salem Senators players
San Diego Padres (minor league) players
Texas City Texans players
West Palm Beach Indians players